The Van Hoevenberg Trail is a hiking trail that leads southward from Adirondak Loj to the peak of Mount Marcy, the highest point in New York State. Located in the High Peaks Wilderness Area, it is the shortest and most frequently-used route to get to the peak of Mount Marcy. It spans 7.4 miles (11.2 km) to the summit, a lengthy 14.8-mile (22.4 km) roundtrip which can be completed in a day. A large section of the trail is suitable for alpine skiing and snowboarding.  Hiking the trail is considered at least moderately difficult. The trail passes over Marcy Dam.

Amenities 

Adironack Loj at the start of the trail provides lodging and meals by reservation. There are also campgrounds and restrooms after about 2 miles into the trail, and further campgrounds and restrooms at about 3 miles into the trail. Note that the New York Department of Environmental Conservation requires that anyone camping overnight in the region must keep their food stored in bear canisters.

See also 
 List of trails in New York

External links 
 Mount Marcy Hiking Trail Guide: Map, Trail Descriptions, Pictures & More (Includes a map of the trail)

References 

Hiking trails in New York (state)